In:vite U  is the twelfth Korean extended play by South Korean boy group Pentagon. It was released on January 24, 2022, by Cube Entertainment and Universal Music. In:vite U topped the Gaon Albums Chart within the month of its release, making it Pentagon's first No. 1 album in South Korea. The physical album is available in two versions: Nouveau and Flare.

Commercial performance 
In:vite U topped iTunes Top Albums chart in 30 regions around the world, including Spain, Mexico, Russia, Brazil, and Poland. The album's title track “Feelin’ Like” also reached No. 1 on iTunes’ Top Song charts in 11 regions, including Peru, Ecuador, Brazil, Mexico, Argentina, and Colombia. The album charted at No. 1 on the Gaon Albums Chart, making it Pentagon's first album to achieve the feat. The lead single "Feelin' Like" opened at No. 98 on the Gaon Digital Chart, and topped the Gaon Download chart. In addition, the remaining songs on In:vite U all charted at various spots on the Gaon Download chart. 

According to Hanteo, In:vite U sold 76,996 copies in its first week of release (January 24 to 30), making it Pentagon's highest first-week sales yet, breaking their previous record of 70,731 with Love or Take.

Track listing

Accolades

Charts

Weekly charts

Monthly charts

References

2022 EPs
Cube Entertainment EPs
Korean-language EPs
Pentagon (South Korean band) EPs
Kakao M EPs
Albums produced by Wooseok
Albums produced by Kino (singer)